The Central Confederacy was a proposed nation made up of American states in the border and middle states prior to the outbreak of the American Civil War in 1861.

Background
In 1861, states located in the southern region of the United States, withdrew from the union after the 1860 election of Abraham Lincoln, out of fear that he would hurt the institution of slavery. These southern states formed the Confederate States of America.

Many prominent speakers from both the North and Middle States expressed a desire to allow the southern states to secede peacefully. In the middle states, there also existed a sentiment to actually join the Southern Confederacy. Former Congressman John Pendleton Kennedy and Governor Thomas Hicks, both of Maryland, called for a Central Confederacy composed of the states of Virginia, Kentucky, Tennessee, Missouri, North Carolina, and Maryland.

The plan
Kennedy published a pamphlet entitled The Border States on December 15, 1860, that suggested the secession and confederation of the Border States of Virginia, Kentucky, Tennessee, Missouri, North Carolina, and Maryland. Hicks advocated the plan during a January 2, 1861, letter to Delaware Governor William Burton. As the southern Confederacy peacefully formed, sentiment among the newspapers and people of Maryland, Delaware, New Jersey, Pennsylvania, and New York were at its highest for the formation of a Central Confederacy. However, this rhetoric reversed following the southern attack on Fort Sumter.

References

American Civil War
Proposed countries
Separatism in the United States
1860 introductions